James Kim is an American businessman who founded the chipmaker Amkor. Kim immigrated to the United States from South Korea in 1955 and started Amkor Electronics as a law student. Kim took the company public in 1998 and stepped down as CEO in 2009, while staying on as the executive chairman of the Board. In 2005, Kim bought out GameStop in a deal valued at $1.4 billion.

He and his family have a net worth of US$1.6 billion according to Forbes.

External links
Forbes profile

References

American billionaires
American manufacturing businesspeople
American people of Korean descent
American technology chief executives
American technology company founders
Living people
Year of birth missing (living people)
Place of birth missing (living people)
American computer businesspeople